Crashin' Broadway (also known as Crashing Broadway) is a 1933 American Western film directed by John P. McCarthy and written by Wellyn Totman.

Cast 
Rex Bell as Tad Wallace
Doris Hill as Sally Sunshine
Harry Bowen as Fred Storm
George Hayes as J. Talbot Thorndyke
Charles King as Gus Jeffries
Henry Roquemore as Levi
Lewis Sargent as John Griswold
Vera Calbert as Mrs. Pinkham
George Morrell as Ernie Tupper
Perry Murdock as Eddie Tupper

References

External links 

Films directed by John P. McCarthy
American Western (genre) films
1933 Western (genre) films
1933 films
American black-and-white films
1930s English-language films
1930s American films